In Christian theology, charity (Latin: caritas) is considered one of the seven virtues and is understood by Thomas Aquinas as "the friendship of man for God", which "unites us to God". He holds it as "the most excellent of the virtues". Further, Aquinas holds that "the habit of charity extends not only to the love of God, but also to the love of our neighbor".

The Catechism of the Catholic Church defines "charity" as "the theological virtue by which we love God above all things for His own sake, and our neighbor as ourselves for the love of God".

Caritas: the altruistic love
The phrase Deus caritas est from —or Θεὸς ἀγάπη ἐστίν (Theos agapē estin) in the original Greek is translated in the King James Version as: "God is love", and in the Douay-Rheims bible as: "God is charity". Thomas Aquinas does not simply equate charity with "love", which he holds as a passion, not a virtue. The King James Version uses both the words charity and love to translate the idea of caritas/ἀγάπη (agapē): sometimes it uses one, then sometimes the other, for the same concept.  Most other English translations, both before and since, do not; instead, throughout they use the same more direct English word love.  Love can have other meanings in English, but as used in the New Testament it almost always refers to the virtue of caritas.

Many times when charity is mentioned in English-language bibles, it refers to "love of God", which is a spiritual love that is extended from God to man and then reflected by man, who is made in the image of God, back to God. God gives man the power to act as God acts (God is love), man then reflects God's power in his own human actions towards others. One example of this movement is "charity shall cover the multitude of sins". "The practice of charity brings us to act toward ourselves and others out of love alone, precisely because each person has the dignity of a beloved child of God."

As a theological virtue

Charity is held to be the ultimate perfection of the human spirit, because it is said to both glorify and reflect the nature of God. Confusion can arise from the multiple meanings of the English word "love".  As other theological virtues, Charity is divinely infused into the soul; it resides in the will.  According to Aquinas, charity is an absolute requirement for happiness, which he holds as man's last goal.

Charity has two parts: love of God and love of man, which includes both love of one's neighbor and one's self.

In 1 Corinthians 13, Paul places the greater emphasis on Charity (Love). "So faith, hope, love remain, these three; but the greatest of these is love." He describes it as:

The fruits of charity are joy, peace, and mercy.

In December 2005, Pope Benedict XVI issued the encyclical Deus caritas est, in which he discussed "... the love which God lavishes upon us and which we in turn must share with others."

Based on the Matthew 25's Parable of The Sheep and the Goats, the early Church saw the love of the poor (periptochias) as the crown jewel of the virtues. Cappadocian father St. Gregory of Nazianzus wrote that

After considering many of the Christian virtues, he concludes that

See also

 Charity (practice)
 Great Commandment
 The six other of the Capital Virtues
 Chastity
 Diligence
 Humility
 Kindness
 Patience
 Temperance
 Love for enemies
 Loving-kindness and similar or related concepts:
 Agape – a Greek word with meanings of "loving-kindness" or "love"
 Chesed – a similar Hebrew term, given the association of kindness and love
 Mettā – a Buddhist Pāli term glossed as "loving-kindness" and "friendliness"
 Seven Deadly Sins (opposite of the seven virtues)
 Virtue
 Altruism
 Dāna (Generosity as understood in Dharmic religions)
Ren (Confucianism)
Zidqa (Mandaeism)

Sources
 See Questions 23-46

 John Bossy, Christianity in the West 1400–1700 (Oxford 1985), 168.

References

Christian ethics
Christian terminology
Divine Mercy
Love
Virtue
Seven virtues
Fruit of the Holy Spirit
Altruism